In biological systems, a double layer is the surface where two different phases of matter are in contact. Biological double layers are much like their interfacial counterparts, but with several notable distinctions.

The surface of biological cells carry many different types of chemical groups, each with a different dissociation constant, causing them to have varying electric charges at a physiological pH. This indicates that biosurfaces are chemically heterogeneous. This biospecific feature is typical for all biosurfaces, including proteins, macromolecules and biological cells.

In certain organisms, cells are covered with the glycocalyx layer, which can be modeled as a polyelectrolyte layer with a volume spread electric charge. This means that the notion of a surface charge is located on certain flat surfaces. This does not apply; instead, the cell surface is a finite thickness polyelectrolyte layer with a volume charge. At equilibrium, the relationship between these polyelectrolyte layers and a fluid bulk is called the Donnan equilibrium. The polyelectrolyte volume charge creates an equilibrated electric potential known as the Donnan potential. Part of the Donnan potential is located inside of the polyelectrolyte layer, while the other part is associated with the external double layer located in the dispersion medium.

In another feature, the cells are not in an equilibrium with the fluid bulk. There is a constant ion exchange between living cells and a fluid. Consequently, there is a difference in electric potentials between the cell interior and a fluid bulk, known as the transmembrane potential. This non-equilibrium potential affects the structure of the double layer.

Notes

General references
Ohshima. H. Theory of Colloid and Interfacial Electric Phenomena, Elsevier, 2006.
Duval, J.F.L. and oth. Langmuir, 21, 11268-11282 (2005).

Physical chemistry
Colloidal chemistry